Hogback Hill is a rounded mountain,  high, rising just north of Hjorth Hill and  west of Cape Bernacchi, in Victoria Land, Antarctica. It was charted and given this descriptive name by the British Antarctic Expedition, 1910–13, under Robert Falcon Scott.

References

Mountains of Victoria Land
Scott Coast